The 1946–47 Scottish League Cup final was played on 5 April 1947, at Hampden Park in Glasgow and was the final of the first official Scottish League Cup competition. The final was contested by Rangers and Aberdeen. Rangers won the match 4–0 thanks to goals by Jimmy Duncanson (2), Torrance Gillick and Billy Williamson.

Match details

External links
 Soccerbase

1947 04
League Cup Final
Scottish League Cup Final 1947 04
Scottish League Cup Final 1947 04
1940s in Glasgow
April 1947 sports events in the United Kingdom